Real Live Thing is a live album from Finnish rock band Kingston Wall, which was compiled by Jukka Jylli.

Track listing

CD One
 With My Mind  – 6:13
 Two Of A Kind  – 7:15
 I'm The King I'm The Sun  – 6:35
 Get Rid Of Your Fears  – 1:20
 When Something Old Dies  – 2:36
 Take You To Sweet Harmony  – 3:06
 Love Tonight  – 7:04
 For All Mankind  – 6:26
 Istwan  – 2:04
 Could It Be So  – 5:51
 Time  – 8:02
 Waste Of Time  – 13:00

CD Two
 Nepal  – 8:53
 Mushrooms Prelude  – 2:05
 And I Hear You Call  – 5:10
 Circumstances  – 9:10
 I'm Not The One  – 2:20
 Can't Get Thru'  – 5:37
 Used To Feel Before  – 5:03
 Shine On Me  – 8:46
 You  – 10:53
 Palékastro  – 7:12

CD Three
 Skies Are Open  – 7:27
 Welcome To The Mirrorland  – 2:16
 On My Own  – 10:04
 We Cannot Move  – 9:02
 And It's All Happening  – 5:31
 Another Piece Of Cake  – 4:02
 The Real Thing  – 7:54
 The Answer  – 5:09
 Have You Seen The Pygmi-mies  – 2:12

Personnel
Petri Walli - guitars, vocals
Jukka Jylli - bass
Sami Kuoppamäki - drums

Additional musicians
Sakari Kukko - Tenor sax (CD2 Track 8)
Tommi Lindell - Keyboards & pulputus (CD3 Tracks 7-8)
Anatoli Guzarov - Bongos (CD3 Track 9)
Pedro Cucaracha - FreakOut percussion (CD2 Track 4)
Kie von Hertzen - Cover Art
John Vihervä - Photos

Kingston Wall albums
2005 live albums